The Elusive Quality Stakes is a Listed American Thoroughbred horse race run annually at Belmont Park racetrack in Elmont, New York. The race was named after Elusive Quality. The race was first ran in 2014. There was no running in 2020

Records

Most wins by a jockey:

 2-Javier Castellano (2014,2022)

Most wins by a trainer:

 2-Christophe Clement (2017,2019)
 2-Chad C. Brown (2014, 2016)

Most wins by an owner

All owners have one win

Winners

References
http://www.usatoday.com/story/sports/horseracing/2014/05/01/integrity-wins-belmonts-elusive-quality-stakes/8578507/

Horse races in New York (state)